William Leopold Essex (February 8, 1886 – February 26, 1959) was fourth bishop of the Episcopal Diocese of Quincy.

Early life and education
Essex was born in Piermont, New York to William Essex and Elizabeth Looser Essex. He was educated at the high school of Nyack, New York, before studying at Columbia University from where he earned a Bachelor of Arts in 1906. Following education at Columbia University, he studied at the General Theological Seminary, where he graduated with a Bachelor of Divinity in 1911. He was awarded a number of honorary doctorates; a Doctor of Sacred Theology from Columbia University in 1937 and from the General Theological Seminary in 1938, respectively, and a Doctor of Divinity from Nashotah House in 1936.

Ordained Ministry
Essex was ordained deacon in May 1910 by Bishop Sidney Catlin Partridge and priest on June 11, 1911, by Bishop David H. Greer of New York. Essex married Charlotte Josephine Nason on June 11, 1914. He was curate at Trinity Church, Newport, Rhode Island from 1910 till 1913, and then rector of St Peter's Church in St. Louis, Missouri from 1913 till 1917. In 1918 he became rector of Trinity Church in Rock Island, Illinois, while in 1925 became rector of St Paul's Church in Peoria, Illinois, where he remained till 1936.

Episcopate
On June 5, 1936, Essex was elected as the forth Bishop of Quincy and was consecrated bishop on September 29, 1936, by Presiding Bishop James De Wolf Perry served as diocesan bishop until 1958. He died a few months later, on February 26, 1959, at the St Francis Hospital in Peoria, Illinois.

References
 
Article in The Living Church, May 16, 1936, pp. 631, 637.

1886 births
1936 deaths
Columbia University alumni
People from Piermont, New York
General Theological Seminary alumni
20th-century American Episcopalians
Episcopal bishops of Quincy